Hewa Matara Gamage Siripala Palihakkara (born 1947) is a Sri Lankan civil servant, diplomat and former Governor of Northern Province.

Early life and family
Palihakkara was born in 1947. After school he joined the University of Ceylon, Peradeniya from where he graduated with a Bachelor of Education degree.

Palihakkara is married and has one child. He is a Buddhist and is from Matara.

Career
Palihakkara joined the Sri Lanka Overseas Service (the foreign service) in 1979, receiving training in Australia in 1980. He then studied international human rights and humanitarian law at the Raul Wallenberg Institute, Lund University.

Palihakkara was Sri Lanka’s Permanent Representative to the United Nations Office at Geneva and an officer at Sri Lanka's UN Mission in New York. He was ambassador to Thailand from 2001 to 2004 (also accredited to Cambodia, Laos and Vietnam). He was also Sri Lanka's Permanent Representative to the United Nations Economic and Social Commission for Asia and the Pacific. He was appointed Foreign Secretary on 20 April 2004, retiring on 31 December 2006. He served as Director General of government's Peace Secretariat at the same time (he had been deputy chief of the secretariat before being appointed foreign secretary).

Palihakkara was appointed Permanent Representative of Sri Lanka to the United Nations in August 2008, serving until August 2009. During the bitter fighting in the final months of the Sri Lankan Civil War Palihakkara defended the Sri Lankan military at the United Nations Security Council, denying that they had fired heavy weapons into the "No Fire Zone".

In May 2010 President Mahinda Rajapaksa appointed Palihakkara a member of the Lessons Learnt and Reconciliation Commission. Palihakkara appointment was criticised because, as Sri Lanka's Permanent Representative to the United Nations, he represented the government and defended the actions of the Sri Lankan military during the final months of the civil war when both sides of the conflict are alleged to have committed war crimes.

Newly elected President Maithripala Sirisena appointed Palihakkara Governor of Northern Province on 27 January 2015. He resigned in February 2016.

References

1947 births
Alumni of the University of Ceylon (Peradeniya)
Ambassadors of Sri Lanka to Cambodia
Ambassadors of Sri Lanka to Laos
Ambassadors of Sri Lanka to Thailand
Ambassadors of Sri Lanka to Vietnam
Governors of Northern Province, Sri Lanka
Living people
Lund University alumni
Permanent Representatives of Sri Lanka to the United Nations
Permanent secretaries of Sri Lanka
People from Matara, Sri Lanka
Sinhalese civil servants
Sri Lankan diplomats
Sri Lankan Buddhists